Jermaine Elliott Kelly Jr. (born February 26, 1995) is an American football cornerback for the Memphis Showboats of the United States Football League (USFL). He played college football at San Jose State and Washington. Kelly had 26 tackles and one fumble recovery as a junior. In 2017, he recorded 53 tackles, one sack and one interception. He was drafted by the Houston Texans in the seventh round of the 2018 NFL Draft. Kelly has also been a member of the San Francisco 49ers, BC Lions, and Saskatchewan Roughriders.

Early years
Kelly was born in San Bernardino, California, and raised in Los Angeles. While playing high school football at Salesian High School, Kelly was an ESPN three-star recruit who received offers from Arizona, Arizona State, Boise State, Hawaii, Houston, Memphis, Minnesota, Northern Colorado, UCLA, USC, Utah, UTEP, and Washington. On January 7, 2013, Kelly committed to play for Washington.

College career
After his second year at the University of Washington, Kelly transferred to San Jose State. Kelly transferred due to family obligations and a history of injuries that prevented him from playing to his full potential.

After redshirting the 2015 season, Kelly played for the San Jose State Spartans from 2016 to 2017. In 25 games, Kelly had 17 starts and made 79 tackles (one for loss), one interception, and 12 passes defended. His only interception was a 68-yard touchdown return in the September 23, 2017 game against Utah State, a 61-10 loss.

Professional career

Houston Texans
Kelly was drafted by the Houston Texans in the seventh round, 222nd overall, of the 2018 NFL Draft. He was placed on injured reserve on September 3, 2018.

On August 16, 2019, Kelly was waived/injured by the Texans and placed on injured reserve. He was waived on August 24.

San Francisco 49ers
On December 11, 2019, Kelly was signed to the San Francisco 49ers practice squad. He re-signed with the 49ers on February 5, 2020. He was waived on July 28, 2020.

BC Lions
Kelly signed with the BC Lions of the CFL on March 11, 2021. Kelly did not make an appearance for the Lions during the 2021 season.

Saskatchewan Roughriders 
On April 28, 2022, Kelly signed with the Saskatchewan Roughriders. He was released on May 14, 2022.

Tampa Bay Bandits
Kelly signed with the Tampa Bay Bandits of the United States Football League on May 25, 2022.

Memphis Showboats
Kelly and all other Tampa Bay Bandits players were all transferred to the Memphis Showboats after it was announced that the Bandits were taking a hiatus and that the Showboats were joining the league.

References

External links
Houston Texans bio
San Jose State bio

1995 births
Living people
American football cornerbacks
BC Lions players
Houston Texans players
Players of American football from Los Angeles
Players of Canadian football from Los Angeles
San Francisco 49ers players
San Jose State Spartans football players
Saskatchewan Roughriders players
Tampa Bay Bandits (2022) players
Washington Huskies football players